Miguel Caballero S.A.S. is an international protective clothing company based in Bogotá, Colombia, operating branches in Mexico and Guatemala. The company specialises in fashionable armored clothing. Notable clients include King Felipe VI of Spain, Michael Bloomberg, former Colombian president Álvaro Uribe, former Venezuelan President Hugo Chávez,  former U.S. President Barack Obama, and former Mexican President Enrique Peña Nieto.

History 
The company was founded in 1992 by Miguel Caballero as part of a graduation project at the University of Los Andes. He had the idea to produce fashionable clothes that incorporated protection from bullets. In 1993, Miguel Caballero conducted a test of one of his armoured garments by shooting a person wearing one, which led to the company slogan, "I was shot by Miguel Caballero."

He developed the first ever de-mining suits in 1995 in collaboration with the Colombian National Army.

Miguel Caballero is the first Latin American company to meet the NIJ 0101.04 standard (1996) and the NIJ 0101.06 standards (2001). In 2006, Caballero opened the first boutique specialising in armoured garments in Mexico City, and in 2009 the company opened its first production plant in Cota, Cundinamarca in Colombia. In 2013, the company obtained its first patent for an Armoured T-shirt product in Colombia. In addition to the boutique in Mexico, Miguel Caballero opened its second international corporate office in Guatemala City in 2014. In 2015, Miguel Caballero obtained the ISO 14001 certification, the MC4-G and S33 brands were launched, and the first patent in Mexico for the Armoured T-shirt product was acquired.

Products 
Miguel Caballero clothes claim to protect the wearer against bullets, knives, fire, water, and air. Caballero describes the material from which he creates his apparel as "a hybrid between nylon and polyester," which is lighter and thinner than Kevlar, a textile often used in body armour. Miguel Caballero currently markets 5 brands: Black, MC4-G, S33, Turer and Gold.

Black 
The Black line consists of fashionable and inconspicuous armoured clothing: bulletproof vests, armoured jackets and T-shirts. The armored collection has been worn by heads of state, businessmen and celebrities. The company began by making bulletproof leather and suede jackets and now includes raincoats, blazers and a women's line.

MC4-G 
MC4-G covers a range of products aiming to help with private security, such as armoured augmentations for motorised vehicles, bulletproof suitcases and backpacks, fashionable vests.

S33 
S33 is aimed at military and armed forces, intelligence and investigative groups, administrative tactical and criminology units, as well as state protection organizations at the national and international level. It covers the needs of public servants and their movable and immovable property including ships and aircraft.

Turer 
The Turer provides motorcycle clothing.

Gold 
The Gold line includes belts, trauma plates and bulletproof backpacks for kids.

Certifications 

 8 NIJ certifications
 ISO 9001
 ISO 14001
 BASC
 ICONTEC
 IQNET
 IDIC
 RENAR
 F.A.N
 TNO

The clothing can withstand ammunition from weapons including the 9mm, .44 Magnum, .40 S&W, .45 ACP, .50 AE, 5.56, 7.62 mm NATO, 6.8mm SPC and a .50 caliber round.

Recognition 
In 2006, Miguel Caballero was selected as one of the 31 best business ideas in the world by Business 2.0 magazine. The company has been featured in The New York Times, The Economist, The Financial Times, CNN, BBC, BusinessWeek, VICE, Wired magazine, El Tiempo, El Pais, El Heraldo, Vanguardia, RCN Radio, The History Channel and The Discovery Channel.

World presence

Americas 
 Colombia
 United States
 El Salvador
 Nicaragua
 Costa Rica
 Panama
 Ecuador
 Peru

Europe 

 Russia
 Netherlands
 Germany

Middle-East 

 United Arab Emirates

Asia 

 Philippines
 Thailand

See also 

 Aramid
 Ballistic vest

References

External links 

 
 BBC News:  Bullet-proof fashion for S Africa 14 August 2008.
 New York Times: The Right Thing to Wear at the Wrong End of a Gun
 Bulletproof kimono: An interview with Miguel Caballero
 Bulletproof fashion for London's super rich – Telegraph
 Miguel Caballero, the Armani of armor – Telegraph
Body armor
Manufacturing companies of Colombia
Companies based in Bogotá
Clothing companies established in 1992
Colombian brands